The Homosexual Offences (Northern Ireland) Order 1982, No. 1536 (N.I. 19), is an Order in Council which decriminalized homosexual acts between consenting adults in Northern Ireland. The Order was adopted as a result of a European Court of Human Rights case, Dudgeon v. United Kingdom (1981), which ruled that Northern Ireland's criminalisation of homosexual acts between consenting adults was a violation of Article 8 of the European Convention on Human Rights.

The homosexual age of consent fixed by the Order (21) was higher than the heterosexual age of consent in the rest of the United Kingdom, which had been set at 16 for decades, and also higher than the heterosexual age of consent in Northern Ireland, which had been set at 17 for decades, but was equal to the homosexual age of consent in England, which was also 21 at this time. The ages of consent for homosexual and heterosexual acts in Northern Ireland were eventually equalised at 17 by the Parliament of the United Kingdom with the passage of the Sexual Offences (Amendment) Act 2000.

To bring Northern Ireland in line with the rest of the United Kingdom, the Sexual Offences (Northern Ireland) Order 2008 reduced the age of consent to 16.

See also

LGBT rights in Northern Ireland
Sexual Offences Act 1967, the Act which decriminalized male homosexual acts in England and Wales.
Criminal Justice (Scotland) Act 1980, the Act which decriminalized male homosexual acts in Scotland.

References

External links

<

Laws of Northern Ireland
LGBT in Northern Ireland
LGBT law in the United Kingdom
1982 in LGBT history
1982 in Northern Ireland
1982 in British law
LGBT rights in Northern Ireland
Orders in Council